After 2021 Puducherry Legislative Assembly election, N. Rangaswamy was sworn in as Chief Minister of Puducherry on 7 May 2021. According to a Puducherry Gazette notification dated 25 May 2021, "the President has been pleased to appoint" A Namassivayam, K Lakshminarayanan, C Djeacoumar, Chandira Priyanga and A K Sai J Saravana Kumar as Ministers in the cabinet.

Three ministers from AINRC are Lakshminarayanan, Djeacoumar and Priyanga, while the remaining are from BJP.

Chief Minister & Cabinet Ministers

Notes

References

All India N.R. Congress
N. Rangaswamy
Cabinets established in 2021
N. Rangaswamy
Government of Puducherry